Alexandra Lydon is an American actress and writer.

Early life and education
Lydon was born and raised in Dorchester, Boston. She attended the New York University Tisch School of the Arts where she studied at the affiliated Stella Adler Conservatory, graduating with honors with a double degree in Drama and Psychology. Her further studies were with Joseph Chaikin, Larry Moss and Patsy Rodenburg.

Career 
Some of Lydon's most prominent roles were as Jane Saunders, daughter of primary villain Stephen Saunders, in the third season of the television series 24 and as Ann Owens in Prison Break. She starred in the independent film Nail Polish and IFC film Bodies, and along with 24 and  Prison Break has had recurring roles on CSI: Miami and K-Ville. She has made numerous guest-starring appearances on popular shows such as CSI: Crime Scene Investigation, Desperate Housewives, House, Private Practice, NCIS and Star Trek: Enterprise.

Lydon co-created and performed in the comedy show Worst Laid Plans at the Upright Citizens Brigade Theatre in Los Angeles and New York City. She later adapted the show into a book, Worst Laid Plans: When Bad Sex Happens to Good People, published by Abrams Image. She wrote and performed in the comedy album Worst Laid Plans at the Upright Citizens Brigade Theatre, published by Random House in May 2010.

She had the starring role of Beth in Bryan Bertino's film Mockingbird (2014), released by Universal Studios. 

Lydon is also a voice-over artist and has narrated and contributed to documentaries films, one being the award-winning The Young and the Restless in China.

In 2015, Lydon developed and produced the ABC pilot "Broad Squad", inspired by the first female policewomen in Boston. She is currently writing a book about the Boston Police Department and the history of race and gender relations in policing, to be published by Flatiron Books, a division of Macmillan Publishers.

Filmography

References

External links 
 

21st-century American actresses
American film actresses
American television actresses
American stage actresses
Actresses from Boston
Tisch School of the Arts alumni
Living people
People from Dorchester, Massachusetts
Year of birth missing (living people)